Wouter Sybrandy (born 20 February 1985) is a Dutch former professional road racing cyclist, who rode professionally for  between 2009 and 2013.

Biography
Sybrandy was born in the Netherlands but spent most of his career in the United Kingdom. Although Dutch, in 2008, he came second in the British National Time Trial Championships to Michael Hutchinson. In 2012, Sybrandy suffered a crash in the Tour of Britain, causing fractures to his cheekbone and eye socket, as well as fractures to three lower vertebrae. When  folded at the end of the 2013 season, Sybrandy was left without a team, and decided to return to full-time employment whilst also pursuing his racing career with support from Sigma Sport, the sponsor of his old team. It was announced that Sybrandy would be team leader for the Nuun–Sigma Sport–London team for the 2015 season.

Major results

2007
 2nd Time trial, British National Under-23 Road Championships
2008
 2nd Time trial, British National Road Championships
 2nd Redmon Grand Prix des Gentlemen (with Paul Innes)
2009
 1st East Yorkshire Classic Roadrace
 5th Time trial, British National Road Championships
2010
 1st Redmon Grand Prix des Gentlemen (with Jeff Marshall)
 3rd Ryedale Grand Prix
 9th Overall Tour of the Reservoir
2011
 1st Glade Spring Road Race
 9th Overall Rás Tailteann
2012
 2nd Overall Tour of Jamtland
 7th Overall Tour Doon Hame
 7th Rutland–Melton International CiCLE Classic
2013
 1st Team time trial, British National Road Championships (with Joe Perrett and Andrew Griffiths)
2014
 6th Overall Tour of Al Zubarah
2015
 1st Addiscombe CC Open 10 mile TT
 9th Chorley Grand Prix

References

External links

1985 births
Living people
Dutch male cyclists
Cyclists from The Hague